Walter Boyce "Red" Rountree (May 31, 1903 – April, 1980)  was a  physician in Birmingham, Alabama. Rountree played college football and was a prominent halfback for coach Dan McGugin's Vanderbilt Commodores football team from 1920 to 1923. In 1922, Rountree played quarterback in the game against Mercer and was the star. In 1923, Rountree ran for a 63-yard touchdown in the 51–7 victory over the rival Tennessee Volunteers.

References

External links
 

1903 births
1980 deaths
American football halfbacks
American football quarterbacks
Vanderbilt Commodores football players
People from Hartselle, Alabama
Physicians from Birmingham, Alabama
Players of American football from Birmingham, Alabama